Kettle Creek may refer to:

In Canada
Kettle Creek (Ontario), a tributary of Lake Erie
Port Stanley, Ontario, a community originally known as Kettle Creek

In the United States
Kettle Creek (Colorado), a stream in El Paso County
Kettle Creek (Little River tributary), a stream in Georgia
Battle of Kettle Creek, an American Revolutionary War battle
Kettle Creek (Satilla River tributary), a stream in Georgia
Kettle Creek (Missouri)
Kettle Creek (Pennsylvania), a tributary of the West Branch Susquehanna River
Kettle Creek State Park, located on this creek
Kettle Creek (South Fork South Branch Potomac River), West Virginia, a tributary stream